Oliver County is a county located in the U.S. state of North Dakota. As of the 2020 census, the population was 1,877. Its county seat and only city is Center.

History
The Dakota Territory legislature created the county on April 14, 1885, with territory partitioned from Mercer County. It was named for Harry S. Oliver of Lisbon, North Dakota, a Republican politician and member of the Dakota Territory House of Representatives at the time. The county government was organized on May 18, with Sanger (then known as "Bentley") as county seat. The seat was moved to Center in 1902.

Oliver County is included in the Bismarck, North Dakota Metropolitan Statistical Area.

Geography
The northeastern/eastern boundary of Oliver County is delineated by the Missouri River as it flows southeastward after leaving Lake Sakakawea. The county terrain consists of rolling hills, mostly devoted to agriculture. The terrain slopes to the east, with the highest point a hill near its southwestern corner, at 2,382' (726m) ASL. It is the fifth-smallest county in North Dakota by area.

By sheer coincidence, the county seat, Center, named for being near the geographical center of the county, has also been calculated to be the geographic center of North America.

Major highways

  North Dakota Route 25
  North Dakota Route 31
  North Dakota Route 48
  North Dakota Route 1806
  North Dakota Route 200A

Adjacent counties

 McLean County - northeast
 Burleigh County - east
 Morton County - south
 Mercer County - northwest

Protected areas
 Cross Ranch State Park

Lakes
 Mandan Lake
 Nelson Lake

Demographics

2000 census
As of the 2000 census, there were 2,065 people, 791 households, and 604 families in the county. The population density was 2.86/sqmi (1.10/km2). There were 903 housing units at an average density of 1.25/sqmi (0.48/km2). The racial makeup of the county was 97.58% White, 0.15% Black or African American, 1.26% Native American, 0.10% Asian, and 0.92% from two or more races. 0.63% of the population were Hispanic or Latino of any race. 59.2% were of German, 13.6% Norwegian and 6.5% American ancestry.

There were 791 households, out of which 35.50% had children under the age of 18 living with them, 69.20% were married couples living together, 3.90% had a female householder with no husband present, and 23.60% were non-families. 21.00% of all households were made up of individuals, and 10.70% had someone living alone who was 65 years of age or older. The average household size was 2.61 and the average family size was 3.05.

The county population contained 27.40% under the age of 18, 4.70% from 18 to 24, 23.50% from 25 to 44, 30.10% from 45 to 64, and 14.20% who were 65 years of age or older. The median age was 42 years. For every 100 females there were 107.50 males. For every 100 females age 18 and over, there were 106.20 males.

The median income for a household in the county was $36,650, and the median income for a family was $45,430. Males had a median income of $40,577 versus $19,015 for females. The per capita income for the county was $16,271. About 11.20% of families and 14.90% of the population were below the poverty line, including 23.60% of those under age 18 and 13.90% of those age 65 or over.

2010 census
As of the 2010 census, there were 1,846 people, 756 households, and 554 families in the county. The population density was 2.55/sqmi (0.99/km2). There were 905 housing units at an average density of 1.25/sqmi (0.48/km2). The racial makeup of the county was 97.3% white, 1.5% American Indian, 0.2% black or African American, 0.2% Asian, 0.2% from other races, and 0.7% from two or more races. Those of Hispanic or Latino origin made up 1.0% of the population. In terms of ancestry, 66.8% were German, 19.3% were Norwegian, 7.6% were Russian, 6.3% were English, and 4.4% were American.

Of the 756 households, 25.0% had children under the age of 18 living with them, 65.5% were married couples living together, 4.8% had a female householder with no husband present, 26.7% were non-families, and 22.6% of all households were made up of individuals. The average household size was 2.44 and the average family size was 2.84. The median age was 47.6 years.

The median income for a household in the county was $62,308 and the median income for a family was $75,069. Males had a median income of $60,592 versus $28,409 for females. The per capita income for the county was $29,348. About 6.5% of families and 9.7% of the population were below the poverty line, including 13.0% of those under age 18 and 19.6% of those age 65 or over.

Communities

City
 Center (county seat)

Unincorporated communities

 Fort Clark
 Hannover
 Hensler
 Price
 Sanger (originally "Bentley"; now a ghost town)

Politics
Oliver County voters are traditionally Republican. In only one national election since 1936 has the county selected the Democratic Party candidate (as of 2020).

Education
School districts include:

 Beulah Public School District 27
 Center-Stanton Public School District 1
 Glen Ullin Public School District 48
 Hazen Public School District 3
 New Salem-Almont School District
 Washburn Public School District 4

Center previously had a separate school district, but it merged with Stanton's in 2004.

See also
 National Register of Historic Places listings in Oliver County ND

References

External links
 Oliver County map, North Dakota DOT

 
1885 establishments in Dakota Territory
Populated places established in 1885